The discography of American indie pop band Echosmith. Talking Dreams, the band's debut studio album, was released in October 2013, the album peaked at number 38 on the Billboard 200. The album includes the singles "Cool Kids", "Bright" and "Let's Love". "Cool Kids" reached number 13 on the Billboard Hot 100 and was certified triple platinum by the RIAA with over 1,200,000 sales in the United States and also double platinum by ARIA in Australia. The song was Warner Bros. Records' fifth-biggest-selling-digital song of 2014, with 1.3 million downloads sold. Lonely Generation, the band's second studio album, was released in January 2020. The album includes the singles "Lonely Generation" and "Shut Up and Kiss Me".

Studio albums

Extended plays

Singles

As lead artist

Promotional singles

Notes

References

Discographies of American artists
Discography